Carl Leo Holger Nielsen (5 March 1909 – 15 June 1968) was a Danish track cyclist who won a gold medal at the 1928 Summer Olympics with Henry Hansen and Orla Jørgensen and a silver medal at the 1932 Summer Olympics with Hansen and Frode Sørensen.

References

External links
Leo Nielsen's profile at databaseOlympics
Denmark's first Olympic champions

1909 births
1968 deaths
Danish male cyclists
Olympic cyclists of Denmark
Cyclists at the 1928 Summer Olympics
Cyclists at the 1932 Summer Olympics
Olympic gold medalists for Denmark
Olympic silver medalists for Denmark
Olympic medalists in cycling
People from Randers
Medalists at the 1928 Summer Olympics
Medalists at the 1932 Summer Olympics
Sportspeople from the Central Denmark Region